Broadwater is a neighbourhood of Worthing, in the borough of Worthing in West Sussex, England.  Situated between the South Downs and the English Channel, Broadwater was once a parish in its own right and included Worthing when the latter was a small fishing hamlet. Before its incorporation into the Borough of Worthing in 1902 Broadwater also included the manor of Offington to the north. It borders Tarring to the west, Sompting to the east, and East Worthing to the south-east.

Broadwater Green
Broadwater is centred on a large triangular green space area known as 'Broadwater Green' there is a small cricket pavilion to the south side which is home to the Broadwater Cricket Club the oldest cricket club in Worthing who have been playing on the green since 1771. It is also used during the year for various events and activities. A fair visits the Green every year in the early summer, and the Broadwater Festival, held in July, is centered on the green.

Shops and pubs
Broadwater Street West, the A24, runs along the east side of the Green and through the shopping area becoming Broadwater Road by the church. Shops include a traditional sweet shop, a cake decorating and party supplies shop, a florist, a small supermarket, a convenience store, a furniture shop, two hairdressers, a pharmacy, a pet shop, a few charity shops and a doctors surgery. An independent continues to trade despite competition from large local supermarkets. Broadwater is also home to some fast food outlets and one contemporary Indian restaurant. Two pubs are also located in the main parade of shops: a traditional pub, The Cricketers and a more contemporary style bar, The Broadwater.

From the church, Broadwater Road, A24, continues southwards towards Worthing town centre and Broadwater Street East branches off along the north side of the church with interesting old houses.to a roundabout junction with Sompting Road, Dominion Road and Sompting Avenue which is the bypass for traffic from Broadwater Road. Another pub, Ye Olde House At Home is in the road along with another small row of shops, the convenience store by the roundabout sold the first Lottery Jackpot winning ticket though the winner lived in West Chiltington . The land to the north, as far as the A27, is residential. South Broadwater stretches in the opposite direction, also mainly residential. Extensive Trading/Industrial Estates form much of Worthing's eastern boundary north of the railway, the largest complex is that of Glaxo Smith Kline, GSK, pharmaceuticals. Originally called Beechams Penicillin was grown in large vats, when these were cleaned out a horrible smell of rotting Chrysanthemums drifted across the area known as the Worthing pong. Modern production methods have ended this to the relief of local residents especially those allergic to Penicillin.

Church and past residents
At the southern end of the parade of shops is Broadwater Church. Two well-known authors and naturalists, William Henry Hudson and Richard Jefferies are buried in Worthing and Broadwater Cemetery off South Farm Road. The eccentric philanthropist Ann Thwaytes lived at the now-demolished mansion of Charmandean from 1841 to 1866. Former Chief Inspector Walter Dew, CID of Scotland, was married in the church to Florence Idle in 1928: he was the chief investigator in the Crippen murder case, having previously investigated the Whitechapel murders ('Jack the Ripper').

Education
There are nine schools in Broadwater, Broadwater C of E Primary School, Downsbrook Primary School, Springfield Infant School, Whytemead Primary School, Bramber Primary School, the private Lancing College Prep School Worthing (formerly Broadwater Manor School), St Andrew's High School, Worthing High, Davison High School and Bohunt School Worthing

References

Suburbs of Worthing
Market towns in West Sussex